Bactropota is a genus of tephritid  or fruit flies in the family Tephritidae.

Species
Bactropota woodi Bezzi, 1924

References

Tephritinae
Tephritidae genera